Kevin Merida (born January 17, 1957) is an American journalist, author and newspaper editor. He currently serves as executive editor at the Los Angeles Times, where he oversees and coordinates all news gathering operations, including city and national desks, Sports and Features departments, Times Community News and Los Angeles Times en Español.

Prior to joining the Times, Merida was a ESPN senior VP and editor-in-chief. He supervised the creation and launch in May 2016 of Andscape., a multimedia platform that explores the intersections of race, sports and culture. As editor in chief, Merida expanded The Undefeated brand across The Walt Disney Company, with a content portfolio encompassing journalism, documentaries and television specials, albums, music videos, live events, digital talk shows and two bestselling children’s books.

During his tenure at ESPN, Merida oversaw the investigative/news enterprise unit, the television shows “E:60” and “Outside the Lines.” He chaired ESPN’s editorial board.

Early life and education

Kevin Merida was born in Wichita, Kansas, and raised in the Washington, D.C. area. He is the eldest of two children born to the late Jesse Merida, a geologist and paleontologist employed with the United States Geological Survey andSmithsonian Institution. His mother, Doris, (née Ewell) worked as a communications specialist and FOIA officer for the National Science Foundation.

He attended Crossland High School, among the first group of children in the US to be bused under a 1971 Supreme Court ruling.

He graduated from Boston University. After graduating, he attended the University of California, Berkeley's "Summer Program for Minority Journalists." Merida lives in Los Angeles with his wife, journalist, author and former Washington Post columnist Donna Britt. In 2012, The Huffington Post named the couple one of the "Black Voices Power Couples" of the year.

Career

Merida's journalistic and research focus generally involves biographies about "difficult subjects," as described by the Houston Institute for Race & Justice. He has covered biographical subjects like Strom Thurmond, Bob Dole, George W. Bush, and Newt Gingrich.

Merida began his journalism career at the Milwaukee Journal. He served as a general assignments reporter and rotating city desk editor from 1979 to 1983.

In 1983, Merida was recruited by the "Dallas Morning News", where he initially worked as a special projects reporter and local political writer. He was later promoted to Washington-based national correspondent and White House correspondent covering the George H.W. Bush presidency. He concluded his tenure at the paper as assistant managing editor in charge of foreign and national news coverage. At those newspapers, he wrote about crime and society.

He was hired by The Washington Post in 1993. During his 22-year career at the paper, Merida served as a congressional correspondent, national political reporter, longform feature writer, magazine columnist and senior editor in several roles. He was the coordinating editor of the Post’s yearlong 2006 series, “Being a Black Man," which was featured in the newspaper. The series earned a Peabody Award for increasing “our ability to understand the old issues in new ways,” and for its “melding of old and new forms of journalism and pointing to the future of electronic communication.”

In 2008, Merida became Assistant Managing Editor at The Washington Post for the paper's United States national news department. He led the national staff for four years during the Obama presidency. Merida co-authored 'Supreme Discomfort: The Divided Soul of Clarence Thomas, about Clarence Thomas, with Michael A. Fletcher. He teamed with Deborah Willis in 2008 to co-author the bestselling hardcover photo book, Obama, the Historic Campaign in Photographs.

He was named managing editor, "responsible for news and features coverage as well as the Universal News Desk," on February 4, 2013. During his tenure in that position, he helped lead the newspaper to four Pulitzer Prizes. He was instrumental in revamping the Post’s digital presence, transforming the paper’s website into one of the world’s top-ranked online news journals.

After a six-month search, The Los Angeles Times announced on Monday May 3, 2021 that it had selected the seasoned journalist to be Executive Editor of the publication.

Merida serves on the boards of the Pulitzer Prizes, and the Boston University Board of Trustees. In addition, he sits on the boards of the Kaiser Family Foundation, the Maynard Institute for Journalism Education, the Philip Merrill College of Journalism and the Wallace House at the University of Michigan.

In 2020, Merida was named to the Dean’s Advisory Council at the Gwen Ifill College of Media, Arts and Humanities, Simmons University.

Awards and honors

Merida was part of a 1990 Dallas Morning News team that was named a Pulitzer Prize finalist in explanatory journalism for a special report on the world’s “hidden wars.” 

1990, Pulitzer Prize finalist
2000, Journalist of the Year, National Association of Black Journalists
2005, Distinguished Alumni Award from Boston University’s College of Journalism.
2006, Vernon Jarrett Award for Journalistic Excellence
2018, Missouri Honors Medal for Distinguished Service in Journalism Missouri School of Journalism
2020, NABJ Chuck Stone Lifetime Achievement Award.

Personal life 
Merida and his wife have three sons, including actor Darrell Britt-Gibson.

Bibliography

Merida, Kevin. Being a Black Man: At the Corner of Progress and Peril. New York: Public Affairs (2007). 
Merida, Kevin and Deborah Willis. Obama: The Historic Campaign in Photographs. New York: Amistad (2008). 
Merida, Kevin and Michael Fletcher. Supreme Discomfort: The Divided Soul of Clarence Thomas. New York: Broadway (2008).

References

External links

The Washington Post journalists
African-American journalists
Writers from Wichita, Kansas
Boston University alumni
Living people
1957 births